Tenika Davis (born July 16, 1985) is a Canadian actress and model.

Career
Tenika Davis started her career on Canada's Next Top Model. She placed sixth in the competition. She expanded into an acting career making appearances in Wrong Turn 4: Bloody Beginnings and Debug. Davis was cast in a major recurring role as Petra Small in Jupiter's Legacy.

Filmography

References

External links

Living people
1985 births
Actresses from Toronto
Black Canadian actresses
Canadian people of Trinidad and Tobago descent
Female models from Ontario
Canadian television actresses
21st-century Canadian actresses